Johnius is a genus of fishes in the family Sciaenidae. They are commonly known as croakers due to their ability to produce purring, croaking and knocking sounds. The sounds are produced mainly at night and are thought to be either involved in defense or for courtship.

The genus name was erected by Marcus Bloch in 1793 based on a specimen obtained from Tranquebar from Reverend Christoph Samuel John which was named as Johnius carutta. There are about 35 species in the genus, all within the Indo-West Pacific waters. The genus and the tribe Johniini are identified by the hammer-shaped swim bladder with 13-17 branching lateral appendages, the first lateral branch extending to the dorsal corner of the gill opening. The have large paired sagittal otoliths that are triangular.

Species diversity 
Species in the genus include:
 Johnius amblycephalus (Bleeker, 1855) - Bearded croaker
 Johnius australis (Günther, 1880) - Bottlenose jewfish
 Johnius belangerii (Cuvier, 1830) - Belanger's croaker
 Johnius borneensis (Bleeker, 1851) - Sharpnose hammer croaker
 Johnius cantori Bleeker, 1874 
 Johnius carouna (Cuvier, 1830) - Caroun croaker
 Johnius carutta Bloch, 1793 - Karut croaker
 Johnius coitor (Hamilton, 1822) - Coitor croaker
 Johnius distinctus (Tanaka, 1916) 
 Johnius dorsalis (Peters, 1855) - Small kob
 Johnius dussumieri (Cuvier, 1830) - Sin croaker
 Johnius elongatus Lal Mohan, 1976 - Spindle croaker
 Johnius fasciatus Chu, Lo & Wu, 1963 
 Johnius fuscolineatus (von Bonde, 1923) - Bellfish
 Johnius gangeticus Talwar, 1991 
 Johnius glaucus (Day, 1876) - Pale spotfin croaker
 Johnius goldmani (Bleeker, 1855) 
 Johnius grypotus (Richardson, 1846) 
 Johnius heterolepis Bleeker, 1873 - Large-scale croaker
 Johnius hypostoma (Bleeker, 1854) - Small-mouth croaker
 Johnius laevis Sasaki & Kailola, 1991 - Smooth croaker
 Johnius latifrons Sasaki, 1992 - Broad-head croaker
 Johnius macropterus (Bleeker, 1853) - Largefin croaker
 Johnius macrorhynus (Lal Mohan, 1976) - Big-snout croaker
 Johnius majan Iwatsuki, Jawad & Al-Mamry, 2012 - Majan croaker
 Johnius mannarensis Lal Mohan, 1971 - Mannar croaker
 Johnius novaeguineae (Nichols, 1950) - Paperhead croaker
 Johnius novaehollandiae (Steindachner, 1866) 
 Johnius pacificus Hardenberg, 1941 - Pacific croaker
 Johnius philippinus Sasaki, 1999 
 Johnius plagiostoma (Bleeker, 1849) - Large-eye croaker
 Johnius trachycephalus (Bleeker, 1851) - Leaftail croaker
 Johnius trewavasae Sasaki, 1992 - Trewavas croaker
 Johnius weberi Hardenberg, 1936 - Weber's croaker

References 

Sciaenidae
Fish genera